Pariah was an American hard rock band, formed in San Antonio, Texas, United States, while they knew each other in high school. The group consisted of Shandon Sahm son of Doug Sahm, brothers Kyle and Sims Ellison, Jared Tuten and David Derrick. Their influence was heavy metal and they were fans of Guns N' Roses.

History
Their first album Rattle Your Skull was released in 1989 independently. They then were signed to Sick Kid Productions where their album Make Believe was recorded and released in 1992. In 1991 they signed with Geffen Records, recording their album, To Mock A Killingbird, which was released in 1993.

After Geffen dropped them out of their contract, Sims Ellison fell into a depression. He committed suicide on June 6, 1995, at the age of 28 of a self-inflicted gunshot wound. The group immediately disbanded and Sahm and Kyle Ellison joined the Meat Puppets in 1999.

The Sims Foundation was formed in honor of Sims. The charity is for musicians who have mental health issues by supporting them and their families.

Discography

Studio albums
1989 - Rattle Your Skull (Not On Label)
1992 - Make Believe (Sick Kids Productions)
1993 - To Mock A Killingbird (Geffen Records)

Singles
 "Make Believe" 1993
 "Powerless" 1993

Lineups
David Derrick(vocals)
Sims Ellison (bass)
Kyle Ellison (vocals, guitar)
Jared Tuten (guitar)
Shandon Sahm (drums)

References

External links

Musical groups from San Antonio
Musical groups established in 1987
Musical groups disestablished in 1995
Heavy metal musical groups from Texas